Cotylolabium is a genus of flowering plants from the orchid family, Orchidaceae. It contains only one known species, Cotylolabium lutzii, endemic to Brazil.

See also 
 List of Orchidaceae genera

References 

  (1982) Botanical Museum Leaflets 28(4): 307.
  (2003) Genera Orchidacearum 3: 182 ff. Oxford University Press.
  2005. Handbuch der Orchideen-Namen. Dictionary of Orchid Names. Dizionario dei nomi delle orchidee. Ulmer, Stuttgart

External links 

Spiranthinae
Monotypic Orchidoideae genera
Cranichideae genera
Plants described in 1955
Orchids of Brazil